Lachnia subcincta is a species of beetle in the family Cerambycidae, and the only species in the genus Lachnia. It was described by Audinet-Serville in 1835.

References

Onciderini
Beetles described in 1835